Anisyl acetate (4-methoxybenzyl acetate) is an acetate ester of anisyl alcohol. It is a naturally occurring flavor found in various fruits and types of vanilla. It is also used as a flavoring agent to produce a flavor profile described variously as sweet, smooth, fruity (cherry or plum) and vanilla or almond.

References 

Flavors
Acetate esters
Phenol ethers
Benzyl compounds